The Great Lakes Waterway (GLW) is a system of natural channels and artificial canals which enable navigation between the North American Great Lakes. Though all of the lakes are naturally connected as a chain, water travel between the lakes was impeded for centuries by obstacles such as Niagara Falls and the rapids of the St. Marys River.

Its principal civil engineering works are the Welland Canal between Lakes Ontario and Erie, and the huge Soo Locks between Huron and Superior. Dredged channels were constructed in the St. Marys River, the Detroit River, Lake St. Clair and the St. Clair River between Huron and Erie. Usually, one or more U.S. Coast Guard icebreakers help keep the water passage open for part of the fall and early winter, although shipping usually ceases for two to three months thereafter. The St. Lawrence Seaway allows navigable shipping from the GLW to the Atlantic Ocean, while the Illinois Waterway extends commercial shipping to the Mississippi River and the Gulf of Mexico. The Great Lakes Waterway is co-administered by the governments of Canada and the United States of America.

Description
 

Together with the Saint Lawrence Seaway, the Waterway allows both ocean-going vessels and the ore, grain and coal-bearing lake freighters to travel from the system's saltwater outlet to its far interior. The Waterway has larger locks and deeper drafts than the lower Seaway, limiting large freighters to the four lakes upstream of the Welland Canal and Lake Ontario and similarly restricting passage beyond Saint Lambert, Quebec by larger ocean vessels. The two waterways are often jointly and simply referred to as the "St. Lawrence Seaway", since the Great Lakes, together with the St. Lawrence River, comprise a single navigable body of freshwater linking the Atlantic Ocean to the continental interior. Major ports on the Great Lakes Waterway include Duluth-Superior, Chicago, Detroit, Toledo, Cleveland, Twin Harbors, Hamilton and Thunder Bay.

Shipping channels separate upbound traffic from downbound traffic. The upbound direction is away from the St. Lawrence River (westerly or northerly except in Lake Michigan where upbound is southerly). Channels are marked with navigation buoys in constricted areas and pilots are required on foreign boats. Recreational boats can use or cross the ship channels, but the large boats, with limited maneuverability, have right of way.

Map
Map of the North American Great Lakes and the St. Lawrence Seaway from 1959, depicting the entire length beginning at the Gulf of Saint Lawrence in the east to the westernmost terminus at Lake Superior.

See also

 Saint Lawrence Seaway
 Straits of Mackinac

References

External links
 The Great Waterway, South Ontario tourism site

 
Waterways in the United States